The Hobbs News-Sun is a daily newspaper published Tuesday through Sunday in Hobbs, New Mexico, featuring news, sports and other features of interest to readers in Lea County.

The News-Sun was the result of a merger between two of the many local newspapers that appeared in Hobbs in the 1930s, following the region's oil boom at that time. Competition fell away until only the News-Sun and the Hobbs Flare remained.

The Flare was sold to Golden West Free Press in 1993 and was sold to Sun Publishing of Lake Charles, La., in December 1996. It was closed in December 1997. Sun Publishing also owns the Hobbs News-Sun.

History 
The rival paper Flare was founded in 1948 by Agnes Kastner Head, the wife of a candidate for mayor, because Hobbs News-Sun did not want to publish ads for her husband's campaign. 

American poet Dave Oliphant has written in his memoir, Harbingers of Books to Come: A Texan's Literary Life, that his letter to the editor Hobbs News-Sun in 1969 led the list of top ten news stories of the newspaper for the year. Oliphant was employed at the New Mexico Junior College (in Hobbs) during the late 60's and had legal issues with the college and the town of Hobbs, and one of the Hobbs News-Sun editors testified against him in a trial.

References

External links
Hobbsnews.com

Newspapers published in New Mexico